The fourth season of Designing Women premiered on CBS on September 18, 1989, and concluded on May 21, 1990. The season consisted of 28 episodes. Created by Linda Bloodworth-Thomason, the series was produced by Bloodworth/Thomason Mozark Productions in association with Columbia Pictures Television.

Broadcast history
The season originally aired Mondays at 9:30-10:00 pm (EST) on CBS. From 1989 through 1992, Designing Women and Murphy Brown aired back-to-back, creating a very successful hour-long block for CBS, as both shows were thought to appeal to similar demographics. The show was a top 30 hit for three consecutive seasons (1989–92), making it the most successful at the time. The high ratings also helped CBS's ratings overall, which had struggled around the late 1980s.

Cast

Main cast
 Dixie Carter as Julia Sugarbaker
 Annie Potts as Mary Jo Shively
 Delta Burke as Suzanne Sugarbaker
 Jean Smart as Charlene Frazier-Stillfield
 Meshach Taylor as Anthony Bouvier

Recurring cast
 Alice Ghostley as Bernice Clifton
 Douglas Barr as Colonel Bill Stillfield
 Hal Holbrook as Reese Watson
 Richard Gilliland as J.D. Shackleford
 Olivia Brown as Vanessa Hargraves
 Michael Goldfinger as Rusty
 George Newbern as Payne McIlroy

Guest cast

 Ann Dusenberry as Belva McPherson
 Ray Buktenica as Donald Stillman
 Bobbie Ferguson as Monette Marlin
 Dub Taylor as Daddy Jones
 S.A. Griffin as Nub Jones
 Michael Morrison as Rupert Jones
 Mariann Alda as Lita Ford
 Kim Zimmer as Mavis Madling
 Michael Cutt as Dan Madling
 Leslie Ackerman as Phyllis McGuire
 Ann Hearn as Amy Betz
 Henry Cho as Sam

 Dolly Parton as herself
 Beah Richards as Miss. Minnie Bell Ward
 Leann Hunley as Gaby Langford
 Lloyd Bochner as Ansel Pollard
 Constance Towers as Louise Pollard
 Michael Ross as Stan
 Rex Young as Scott
 Jocelyn Seagrave as Sylvie
 Richard Sanders as Elmer Peace
 Karen Kopins as Eugenia Weeks
 Bruce Davison as Reverend Gene Chapman

Episodes

DVD release
The fourth season was released on DVD by Shout! Factory on September 14, 2010.

References

External links
 

Designing Women seasons
1989 American television seasons
1990 American television seasons